Basse Casamance National Park, located near Oussouye in Ziguinchor, is one of six national parks in Senegal. It is currently closed.

History
The park was created in 1970.

Characteristics
It encompasses an area of 5000 hectares.

The main biotopes are Guinean forests and savannah woodlands.

Fauna
There are 200 species of birds and 50 species of mammals, including African forest buffalo, African leopard, Campbell's mona monkey, Prince Demidoff's bushbaby and western red colobus.

Tourism
The site is located 20 kilometers from Cap Skirring Airport.

Because of the Casamance Conflict, the park, possibly mined, has been closed to visitors for several years.

See also
 List of national parks and nature reserves of Senegal
Tourism in Senegal
 Environment of Senegal

References

External links
Protected Areas and World Heritage Programme
 Parks and reserves

National parks of Senegal
Protected areas established in 1970